Acleris shepherdana, the meadow-sweet button, is a species of moth of the family Tortricidae. It is found in Europe, where it has been recorded from Great Britain, France, the Benelux, Germany, Denmark, Austria, Switzerland, Italy, the Czech Republic, Slovakia, Poland, Hungary, Norway, Sweden, Finland, the Baltic region and European Russia. It is also found in the Russian Far East (Ussuri), Manchuria, Mongolia, China and Japan. The habitat consists of fens, marshes, river-banks and other damp areas.

The wingspan is 13–16 mm. The wings are cinnamon-brown with a reticulate (net-like) pattern and a blackish plumbeous (lead colored) outer margin of the costal blotch. Adults are on wing from mid-June to the end of September.

The larvae feed on Spiraea ulmaria, Sanguisorba officinalis, Sanguisorba parviflora, Ulmaria and Filipendula species (including Filipendula kamtschatica). They live in spun shoots of their host plant. Larvae can be found from May to June. Pupation may take place in the larval feeding place, in a folded leaf-edge or on the ground.

References

Moths described in 1852
shepherdana
Moths of Europe
Moths of Asia